The Wan Chai Heritage Trail is a walking trail in Hong Kong.  It was launched on 27 September 2009 and is two hours in duration. It was formed by the Old Wan Chai Revitalisation Initiatives Special Committee (OWCRISC) established by the Development Bureau to promote the local culture, history and architectural style of Wan Chai District.

At present the trail features 15 sites, including the Blue House, Wan Chai Market, Nam Koo Terrace and the Starstreet Precinct.
In 2009, at the trail's launch, nine of these properties were undergoing restoration through projects organised by the Urban Renewal Authority and the Development Bureau. It was expected that the buildings would once again be fully operational in 2013–16; meanwhile visitors could observe many of the external architectural features of the sites on this trail.

List of sites
The Trail is divided into two parts: Architectural Heritage Trail and Cultural Heritage Trail.

Architectural Heritage Trail
 Green House, tong-lau (shophouse), at Nos. 1–11, Mallory Street and Nos. 4–12 Burrows Street
 Hong Kong Tuberculosis, Chest and Heart Diseases Association, part of the Ruttonjee Hospital, No. 266 Queen's Road East, Bauhaus architectural style
 Wan Chai Market, at No. 264 Queen's Road East and Stone Nullah Lane, Streamline Moderne architectural style
 Blue House, Nos. 72-74A Stone Nullah Lane
 Yellow House, Nos. 2–4 Hing Wan Street
 Nos. 186–190 Queen's Road East, tong-laus
 "The Pawn", Nos. 60–66 Johnston Road, tong-laus
 OVOlogue, Nos. 66 Johnston Road, tong-lau
 No. 18 Ship Street, tong-lau
 Nam Koo Terrace, No. 55 Ship Street
 Starstreet Precinct, including No. 31 Wing Fung Street

Cultural Heritage Trail
 Pak Tai Temple, No. 2 Lung on Street, near the upper end of Stone Nullah Lane
 Old Wan Chai Post Office, No. 221 Queen's Road East
 Open Market in Tai Yuen Street and Cross Street
 Hung Shing Temple, Nos. 129–131 Queen's Road East
 Open Market in Gresson Street

See also
 Heritage Trails in Hong Kong

References

External links

 OWCRISC Wan Chai Heritage Trail Official Website
 Old Wan Chai Revitalisation Initiatives Special Committee website

Wan Chai District
Heritage conservation in Hong Kong
Monuments and memorials in Hong Kong
Heritage trails